Minnie B. Smith was an incorporator of Alpha Kappa Alpha Sorority, the first sorority founded by African-American women. Although Smith died young in the influenza epidemic in 1919, the legacy she created with Alpha Kappa Alpha has continued to generate social capital for nearly 100 years.

Smith graduated from Howard University in 1912. She taught at the Mott School while attending college.

Howard University and incorporation
When Smith graduated from Howard University, it was the top historically black college in the nation.  It was a time when only 1/3 of 1% of African Americans and 5% of whites of eligible age attended any college.

When hearing plans of twenty-two members desiring to cede from Alpha Kappa Alpha in order to form a new sorority, Nellie Quander contacted graduate members, including Smith, in order to stop the proposals. As a result, Smith, Quander, Norma Boyd, Julia Evangeline Brooks, Nellie Pratt Russell and Ethel Jones Mowbray incorporated Alpha Kappa Alpha on January 29, 1913. The dissenters formed another sorority entitled, Delta Sigma Theta Sorority. Smith served as the secretary of the incorporating committee and as Supreme Basileus of Alpha Kappa Alpha, while Quander was away studying mentally handicapped children in Delaware.

In 1919, Smith contracted the Spanish influenza, and died shortly after contracting the disease.

References

1919 deaths
Howard University alumni
Alpha Kappa Alpha founders
American educators
Deaths from Spanish flu
African-American educators
Year of birth missing